Gerrit Jan van Otterloo (born 4 May 1949) is a Dutch politician, currently serving as a Member of Parliament for 50PLUS since 11 June 2019. He previously represented the Labour Party between 1986 and 1994.

References

Living people
1949 births
Place of birth missing (living people)
Members of the House of Representatives (Netherlands)